A photocyte is a cell that specializes in catalyzing enzymes to produce light (bioluminescence). Photocytes typically occur in select layers of epithelial tissue, functioning singly or in a group, or as part of a larger apparatus (a photophore). They contain special structures termed as photocyte granules. These specialized cells are found in a range of multicellular animals including ctenophora, coelenterates (cnidaria), annelids, arthropoda (including insects) and fishes. Although some fungi are bioluminescent, they do not have such specialized cells.

Mechanism of light production

Light production may first be triggered by nerve impulses which stimulate the photocyte to release the enzyme luciferase into a "reaction chamber" of luciferin substrate. In some species the release occurs continually without the precursor impulse via osmotic diffusion. Molecular oxygen is then actively gated through surrounding tracheal cells which otherwise limit the natural diffusion of oxygen from blood vessels; the resulting reaction with the luciferase and luciferin produces light energy and a by-product (usually carbon dioxide).

Researchers once postulated that ATP was the source of reaction energy for photocytes, but since ATP only produces a fraction the energy of the luciferase reaction, any resulting light wave-energy would be too small for detection by a human eye. The wavelengths produced by most photocytes fall close to 490 nm; although light as energetic as 250 nm is reportedly possible.

The variations of color seen in different photocytes are usually the result of color filters that alter the wavelength of the light prior to exiting the endoderm, thanks to the other parts of the photophore. The range of colors vary between bioluminescent species.

The exact combinations of luciferase and luciferin types found among photocytes are specific to the species to which they belong. This would seem to be the result of consistent evolutionary divergence.

References

Bioluminescence